Haleji Lake is a perennial freshwater lake in Thatta District of Sindh Province, Pakistan.

History

Haleji Lake was a saline lagoon until the 1930s and was converted into a reservoir to provide additional water to Karachi.
During World War II, additional water was required for troops stationed at Karachi. The then-British Government of Sindh Province decided to increase the capacity of the lake by introducing a feeder canal from the Indus River. Salt water was drained out and an embankment was constructed around the lake which was fed with fresh water through a canal. The work was placed on a war footing and was completed within 24 months in 1943.

Fauna 
Haleji Lake is a wintering site for waterfowl such as cotton teal, Indian spot-billed duck, purple moorhen and pheasant-tailed jacana. It is also a breeding site for egrets and herons.

See also
Hamal Lake
Hadero Lake

References

Lakes of Sindh
Thatta District
Ramsar sites in Pakistan
Tourist attractions in Thatta